Walther Theological Seminary is an institution of theological higher education located in Decatur, Illinois, USA, that  provides preparation of pastors for the congregations and missions of the United Lutheran Mission Association (ULMA) and Confessional Lutheran churches. The Seminary's practice and policy is to ordain only men for the ministry, in accordance with the historic biblical Lutheran view on the role of women. The M.A. degree program has no restrictions.

It offers two master's degrees affiliated with training clergy (M.Div.) and lay people(M.A.).

WTS is unique in that all instructors are active clergy who serve working congregations or missions. As of October, 2012, the faculty collectively averaged 27 years in the ministry.

The seminary operates under a Certificate of Approval and Authorization issued by the Illinois Board of Higher Education in the Prairie Region of the State of Illinois since August 7, 2012.

Seminary students have library borrowing privileges at the on-campus Luther Library, as well as at Millikin University.

References

External links 
 Official Site

Educational institutions established in 2010
Lutheran seminaries
Lutheranism in Illinois
Seminaries and theological colleges in Illinois
Lutheran buildings and structures in North America
2010 establishments in Illinois